The 10th Assembly District of Wisconsin is one of 99 districts in the Wisconsin State Assembly. Located in southeastern Wisconsin, the district is entirely contained within northeastern Milwaukee County.  The district comprises several neighborhoods of the north side of the city of Milwaukee, including the Williamsburg Heights, Arlington Heights, and Grover Heights neighborhoods, as well as the neighboring village of Shorewood.  The district is represented by Democrat Darrin Madison, since January 2023.

The 10th Assembly district is located within Wisconsin's 4th Senate district, along with the 11th and 12th Assembly districts.

History
The district was created in the 1972 redistricting act (1971 Wisc. Act 304) which first established the numbered district system, replacing the previous system which allocated districts to specific counties.  The 10th district was drawn roughly in line with the boundaries of the previous Milwaukee County 25th district, with the addition of the village of Bayside.  The last representative of the Milwaukee 25th district, Jim Sensenbrenner, was elected as the first representative of the 10th Assembly district in the 1972 election.

The 10th district location has remained relatively consistent, in northern Milwaukee County, through all the redistrictings since 1972.  The boundaries of the district have shifted over time to include more of the city of Milwaukee and fewer of the municipalities in the northeast corner of the county.

List of past representatives

References 

Wisconsin State Assembly districts
Milwaukee County, Wisconsin